Zangaruiyeh (also Romanized as Zangārū’īyeh and Zangārū’īeh) is a village in Golashkerd Rural District, in the Central District of Faryab County, Kerman Province, Iran. At the 2006 census, its population was 42, in 11 families.

References 

Populated places in Faryab County